The New Nobility: The Restoration of Russia's Security State and the Enduring Legacy of the KGB (2010) is a non-fiction English-language book by Russian journalists and independent security service experts Andrei Soldatov and Irina Borogan. The introduction is written by Nick Fielding. 
 
In the 2000s (decade) the Russian Federal Security Service, the FSB was given more powers in fighting terrorism and protecting the political regime. The book is an investigation of the Russian security services' activities in 1990-2000s (decade). 
Kirkus Reviews, on Jule 1, 2010:

In short, clear chapters, the authors delineate with substantial evidence FSB activities at home (Lefortovo Prison) and abroad (assassinations and hacking).

A relentless investigation that demonstrates how, with Putin's rise, the KGB has taken its place "at the head table of power and prestige in Russia".

In September 2010, Foreign Affairs published an essay "Russia's New Nobility. The Rise of the Security Services in Putin's Kremlin" adapted from the book.

In July 2011 the Russian version of the book came out, published by Alpina Business Books/United Press (Sanoma Independent Media).

In early September it was the second place on the best seller list. On September 20 the authors were informed by Elena Evgrafova, a chief editor of the Alpina Business Books/United Press, that on September 14, the General Director of the Chekhov Poligraphic Complex, German Kravchenko, received a letter from the Moscow department of the FSB in which the Head of the 2nd Directorate of the 6th Inter-regional Section A. I. Sergeev requests information as to the identities of those individuals who placed the order for the publication of the book The New Nobility.

The book was also published in France, Estonia, Finland   and China.

References

External links
 The New Nobility website 
 FAS Secrecy News, September 13, 2010 "The New Nobility: Russia’s Security State"}
 Who really wields power in Russia | David Hearst | Comment is free | guardian.co.uk}
 State Security, Post-Soviet Style | By EDWARD LUCAS | The Wall Street Journal}

2010 non-fiction books
American history books
Books about the Federal Security Service
Works about the Cold War
PublicAffairs books